Ettore Leale (2 April 1896 – 13 April 1963) was an Italian footballer who played as a midfielder. On 15 January 1922, he represented the Italy national football team on the occasion of a friendly match against Austria in a 3–3 home draw.

References

1896 births
1963 deaths
Italian footballers
Italy international footballers
Association football midfielders
Genoa C.F.C. players
U.S. Alessandria Calcio 1912 players
Footballers from Turin